"Just for You" is a song by American singer Lionel Richie. It was written by Richie, Paul Barry, and Mark Taylor for his same-titled seventh studio album (2004), while production was helmed by the latter. The song was released as the album's lead single and peaked at number 20 on the UK Singles Chart, also reaching the top 30 in Austria, Germany, and Switzerland as well as number six on the US Adult Contemporary. Richie recorded the song again for his 2012 country album Tuskegee, with country singer Billy Currington.

Track listings

Notes
 signifies an additional producer

Charts

Weekly charts

Year-end charts

References

2004 singles
Lionel Richie songs
Songs written by Lionel Richie
2004 songs